Mapaseka Nyokong (nee Koetle) (born 23 March 1989) is a South African actress, business woman and blogger. She is known for her role as Dintle Nyathi in South African soap drama television series Scandal! She appeared on the 2018 Forbes Africa "30 Under 30" list.

Early years and education 
Koetle-Nyokong was born and raised in Bloemfontein, Free State. She began her tertiary education at AFDA, and completed her studies at CityVarsity.

Filmographyr 
After graduating, Koetle-Nyokong landed a lead role for the film production company Second Chances, which was produced by Andile Ncube. In 2012, she starred in Show Off, which was the Arts Alive Festival. She currently plays Dintle in the series Scandal! which airs on e.tv. In 2022 the actress appeared on E vod 's crime-series Gereza. In 2023 the actress landed a leading role on Mzansi Magic comedy series Lenyalo Hase Papadi 

Together with her husband, she opened and runs a franchise restaurant called Gorge Grab n Go Café, situated outside the Sandton Gautrain station in Johannesburg.

She also runs a drive in Bloemfontein through which she donates sanitary pads to needy girls. She blogs about her experiences as a mother and hosts events which focus on anything concerning motherhood.

Personal life
She is married to Nelson Nyokong. Together they have one child, Nema.

References

Living people
21st-century South African businesswomen
21st-century South African businesspeople
South African actresses
People from Bloemfontein
1989 births